Avondale House, in Avondale, County Wicklow, Ireland, is the birthplace and home of Charles Stewart Parnell.  It is set in the Avondale Forest Park, spanning over 2 km2 (500 acres) of land, approximately 1.5 km from the nearby town of Rathdrum. The river Avonmore flows through the park on its way towards the Irish Sea. The House is now a museum.

The house is open to visitors, who are introduced to the house by an audio visual presentation. Other facilities include a restaurant, book shop, picnic areas, children's play area, two orienteering courses and large car/coach park. In the surrounding parkland are tree trails and walks ranging in duration from one to five hours.

History
Avondale House was built in 1777 for Samuel Hayes, a barrister who wrote a book on Irish Forestry and was a pioneer of the re-afforestation of Ireland, planting many thousands of trees on the estate. He bequeathed it to his friend and fellow MP Sir John Parnell, 2nd Baronet, in 1795 and the latter's great-grandson Charles Stewart Parnell was born there in 1846. After Parnell's death in 1891 the estate was sold to a Dublin butcher from Phibsboro who felled most of the trees to recoup his investment.

The house is Georgian, probably designed by James Wyatt and built in 1777. It is notable for its fine plasterwork and still contains many original pieces of furniture. The American Room is dedicated to Admiral Charles Stewart (1778-1869), Parnell's American grandfather who commanded the USS Constitution (now moored in Boston Harbor) during the War of 1812.

The woodlands were renewed in 1904 when the estate was sold to the government. The house was used as a forestry school and the grounds planted with a great variety of trees, the most successful being conifers from the Pacific coast of North America. The grounds now boast specimens of giant redwoods from California and Sitka spruce from British Columbia. The ruins of Parnell's old sawmill and Parnell's well are located on the site. One of the site's attractions is a trackless Forest Train that runs through the park. The outside of the house is featured in a painting in the R. Barry O'Brien 1898 biography of Parnell. In 2019, Failte Ireland announced a major restoration project for Avondale House and Forest Park.

References

External links

Avondale House
Wicklow 400 Celebration

Buildings and structures in County Wicklow
Houses in the Republic of Ireland
Museums in County Wicklow
Historic house museums in the Republic of Ireland
Biographical museums in the Republic of Ireland
Neoclassical architecture in Ireland
1777 establishments in Ireland